Tektology (sometimes transliterated as tectology) is a term used by Alexander Bogdanov to describe a new universal science that consisted of unifying all social, biological and physical sciences by considering them as systems of relationships and by seeking the organizational principles that underlie all systems. Tektology is now regarded as a precursor of systems theory and related aspects of synergetics. The word "tectology" was developed by Ernst Haeckel, but Bogdanov used it for a different purpose.

Overview 
His work Tektology: Universal Organization Science, published in Russia between 1912 and 1917, anticipated many of the ideas that were popularized later by Norbert Wiener in Cybernetics and Ludwig von Bertalanffy in the General Systems Theory. There are suggestions that both Wiener and von Bertalanffy might have read the German edition of Tektology which was published in 1928.

In Sources and Precursors of Bogdanov's Tectology, James White (1998) acknowledged the intellectual debt of Bogdanov's work on tectology to the ideas of Ludwig Noiré. His work  drew on the ideas of Noiré who in the 1870s also attempted to construct a monistic system using the principle of conservation of energy as one of its structural elements.

More recently, in her 2016 book Molecular Red: Theory for the Anthropocene, McKenzie Wark attempts to establish Bogdanov as a precursor to contemporary Anthropocene theorists, like Donna Haraway, by considering Bogdanov's works of fiction as an extension of his general work in Tectology. In this, Wark also considers Tectology as an alternative to the Soviet state philosophy of dialectical materialism, which may help in describing Lenin's vehement opposition to Tectology in his own Materialism and Empirio-Criticism.

Tectology: Topics 
According to Bogdanov  "the aim of Tectology is the systematization of organized experience", through the identification of universal organizational principles: "all things are organizational, all complexes could only be understood through their organizational character."  Bogdanov considered that any complex should correspond to its environment and adapt to it. A stable and organized complex is greater than the sum of its parts. In Tectology, the term 'stability' refers not to a dynamic stability, but to the possibility of preserving the complex in the given environment. A 'complex' is not identical to a  'complicated, a hard-to-comprehend, large unit.

In Tectology, Bogdanov made the first 'modern' attempt to formulate the most general laws of organization. Tectology addressed issues such as holistic, emergent phenomena and systemic development. Tectology as a constructive science built elements into a functional entity using general laws of organization.

According to his "empirio-monistic" principle (1899), he does not recognize differences between observation and perception and thus creates the beginning of a general empirical, trans-disciplinary science of physical organization, as an expedient unity and precursor of Systems Theory and Holism.

The "whole" in Tectology, and the laws of its integrity, were derived from biological rather than the physicalistic view of the world. Regarding the three scientific cycles which comprise the basis of Tectology (mathematical, physico-biological, and natural-philosophical), it is from the physico-biological cycle that the central concepts have been taken and universalized.

The starting point in Bogdanov's Universal Science of Organization - Tectology (1913-1922) was that nature has a general, organized character, with one set of laws of organization for all objects. This set of laws also organizes the internal development of the complex units, as implied by Simona Poustilnik's "macro-paradigm", which induces synergistic consequences into an adaptive assembling phenomenon (1995). Bogdanov's visionary view of nature was one of an 'organization' with interconnected systems. Bogdanov's Tectology outlined the concepts and concerns of Complexity Theory a full 50 years in advance of chaos and fractal mathematics.

Works
Alexander Bogdanov wrote several works about Tectology:
 1901, Poznanie s Istoricheskoi Tochki Zreniya (Knowledge from a Historical Viewpoint), St. Petersburg, 1901.
 1904, Empiriomonizm: Stat'i po Filosofii (Empiriomonism: Articles on Philosophy) in 3 volumes, Moscow, 1904-1906
 1912, Filosofiya Zhivogo Opyta: Populiarnye Ocherki (Philosophy of Living Experience: Popular Essays), St. Petersburg, 1912
 1922 Tektologiya: Vseobschaya Organizatsionnaya Nauka in 3 volumes, Berlin and Petrograd-Moscow, 1922.
 1980, English translation as Essays in Tektology: The General Science of Organization, trans. George Gorelik, Seaside, CA, Intersystems Publications, 1980.

Further reading 
 John Biggart, Georgii Gloveli, Avraham Yassour. Bogdanov and his Work. A guide to the published and unpublished works of Alexander A. Bogdanov (Malinovsky) 1873-1928, Aldershot, Ashgate, 1998, 
 John Biggart, Peter Dudley, Francis King, Aldershot, Ashgate (eds.), Alexander Bogdanov and the Origins of Systems Thinking in Russia,  1998, 
 Stuart Brown. Biographical Dictionary of Twentieth-Century Philosophers, London, Routledge, 2002 (first published in 1996), 
 Peter Dudley, Bogdanov's Tektology (1st Engl transl), Centre for Systems Studies, University of Hull, Hull, UK, 1996
 Peter Dudley, Simona Pustylnik. Reading The Tektology: provisional findings, postulates and research directions, Centre for Systems Studies, University of Hull, Hull, UK, 1995
 George Gorelik, Bogdanov's Tektology: Nature, Development and Influences,  in: Studies in Soviet Thought (1983), Vol. 26, pp. 37–57.
 Simona Pustylnik, "Biological Ideas of Bogdanov's Tektology" presented at the Int'l Conf.: Origins of Organization Theory in Russia and the Soviet Union, University of East Anglia (Norwich), Jan. 8-11, 1995

References

External links
 "Bogdanov and His Work: A Guide to the Published and Unpublished Works of Alexander A. Bogdanov (Malinovsky) 1873-1928": Reference covering Bogdanov's work,
 Alexander Bogdanov 
 About tectology, John A. Mikes, prepared for ICCS [International Conference on Complex Systems, New England Complex Systems Inst. Sept.21-27,1997 Nashua NH USA)  
 Red Hamlet
Science for the better world
Aleksandr Bogdanov’s Tektology: A Proletarian Science of Construction

Systems theory